The 2018 Austrian Grand Prix (formally known as the Formula 1 Eyetime Grosser Preis von Österreich 2018) was a Formula One motor race held on 1 July 2018 at the Red Bull Ring in Spielberg, Austria.

The race was won by Max Verstappen, driving for Red Bull, marking the first time that Red Bull has won at their home Grand Prix.

Report

Background
The circuit included three drag reduction system (DRS) zones for the first time. These included a zone along the main straight, with the second zone on the straight from turn 1 to turns 2 and 3, and a third zone extending from turn 3 to turn 4. Mercedes driver Lewis Hamilton entered the round with a 14-point lead over Sebastian Vettel in the Drivers' Championship. In the Constructors' Championship, Mercedes held a 23-point lead over Ferrari.

Qualifying 
In Q2, Carlos Sainz had to avoid Vettel, who was going slowly on the racing line. Vettel was later awarded a 3-place grid penalty for the incident. Mercedes locked out the front row in Q3 and Valtteri Bottas took his first pole of 2018. The Ferraris locked out the second row. Romain Grosjean outqualified Daniel Ricciardo to take P6.

Race 
Bottas had a poor start from pole position. Initially passed by Hamilton, Räikkönen and Verstappen, he reclaimed P2 overtaking Verstappen and Räikkönen around the outside of Turn 4. Shortly after Verstappen overtook Räikkönen for P3. Stoffel Vandoorne broke his front wing at Turn 3, requiring a pitstop, dropping him to the back of the field. On lap 12, Nico Hülkenberg's engine failed on the start/finish straight, causing his immediate retirement from the race. On lap 14, Bottas retired with a gearbox failure which was originally caused by hydraulic problems, causing a Virtual Safety Car. During the VSC period, Ferrari and Red Bull pitted both their cars. Mercedes however, chose not to pit Hamilton, an error for which James Vowles, Mercedes' chief strategist, was heard to apologize via team radio. Hamilton pitted on lap 25, ceding the lead to Verstappen, and rejoined in P4, ahead of Vettel, who overtook him on lap 39. On lap 54 Ricciardo retired with an exhaust problem and then Brendon Hartley retired on the next lap with a hydraulics issue. Hamilton retired on lap 64 with a fuel pressure problem, giving Mercedes only their third double retirement since returning to F1 as a constructor in 2010 (after Australia 2011 and Spain 2016), their first double retirement due to mechanical failures, and Hamilton's first non-finish since the 2016 Malaysian Grand Prix. Verstappen won the race, giving Red Bull their first win at the Red Bull Ring, and Verstappen his first win of the season. The Haas cars finished P4 and P5, giving them their best points finish ever and Grosjean his first points of the season.

Classification

Qualifying

Notes
  – Sebastian Vettel received a three-place grid penalty for impeding Carlos Sainz Jr. in Q2.
  – Charles Leclerc received a five-place grid penalty for an unscheduled gearbox change.
  – Fernando Alonso required to start from the pit lane for changing to a new specification of front wing assembly and a new MGU-K.
  – Brendon Hartley received a 35-place grid penalty for exceeding his quota of power unit components.

Race 

Notes
  – Lance Stroll originally finished 13th, but had 10 seconds added to his race time for ignoring blue flags.
  – Stoffel Vandoorne retired from the race, but was classified as he completed more than 90% of the race distance.

Championship standings after the race

Drivers' Championship standings

Constructors' Championship standings

 Note: Only the top five positions are included for both sets of standings.

See also 
 2018 Spielberg Formula 2 round
 2018 Spielberg GP3 Series round

References

External links

 Official event website

Austrian
Austrian Grand Prix
Grand Prix
Austrian Grand Prix